Slobozia District is a district of Transnistria. It is the southernmost district of Transnistria, located mostly south of Tiraspol. The district contains 4 cities/towns and 12 communes (a total of 24 localities, including small villages/hamlets):

In addition, the breakaway authorities control the commune of Chițcani of Căușeni District, on the western bank of the river Dniester.

According to the 2004 Census in Transnistria, the population of the district including Chițcani is 95,742. The ethnic composition is: 39,722 (41.49%) Moldovans, 25,436 (26.57%) Russians, 20,772 (21.70%) Ukrainians, 7,323 (7.65%) Bulgarians, 512 (0.53%) Gagauzes, 496 (0.52%) Germans, 475 (0.50%) Belarusians, 35 (0.04%) Jews and 971 (1.01%) others and non-declared. The population of Chițcani is of 9,266 inhabitants.
									
The city of Slobozia has a population of 16,062, including 7,315 Moldovans, 6,507 Russians, 1,696 Ukrainians, 97 Gagauzes, 94 Bulgarians, 72 Germans, 61 Belarusians, 3 Jews and 217 others and non-declared.

List of heads of administration of Slobozia District and the town of Slobozia 
 Sergei Diligul (? - 12 October 2012)
 Vitaliy Dmitrievich Televka (9 November 2012 - 22 October 2013)
 Leonid Nazarovich Petriman (22 October 2013 – )

References

External links 
Map of Transnistria
 Slobozya, center of sports
parcani.at.ua

 
Districts of Transnistria